Thirtyseven is an American pop punk band. They come from Dallas, Texas. The band started making music in 2010. The band released a studio album, This Is What I Want, in 2013, with Blood and Ink Records. They have disbanded as confirmed by Dylan Russell in April of 2020. Band Member Dylan Russell has left the band since and now works on Social Cues and his YouTube channel, YuB, which has over 1 million subscribers.

Background
Thirtyseven is a pop punk band from Dallas, Texas. Their members include Moses Campos, a guitarist, Dylan Russell, a vocalist and bassist, and background vocalist and drummer, Brandon Culpepper.

Music history
The band commenced as a musical entity in 2010, with their first release, Get What You Deserve. This Is What I Want, a studio album, was released on August 6, 2013, from Blood & Ink Records.

Throughout the production of these songs, Dylan made many vlogs of the band's life and performances, which can be seen on his YouTube channel YuB.

Members
Current members
 Moses Campos – vocals, lead guitar
 Dylan Russell – vocals, bass
 Brandon Culpepper – drums

Discography
Studio albums
 This Is What I Want (August 6, 2013, Blood and Ink)

Demos
 Get What You Deserve (2010)

References

External links
 Facebook page
 Blood and Ink Records

Musical groups from Dallas
2010 establishments in Texas
Musical groups established in 2010